Hyalyris is a genus of clearwing (ithomiine) butterflies, named by Jean Baptiste Boisduval in 1870. They are in the brush-footed butterfly family, Nymphalidae.

Species
Arranged alphabetically:
 Hyalyris antea (Hewitson, 1869)
 Hyalyris coeno (Doubleday, [1847])
 Hyalyris excelsa (C. & R. Felder, 1862)
 Hyalyris fiammetta (Hewitson, 1852)
 Hyalyris juninensis Fox & Real, 1971
 Hyalyris latilimbata (Weymer, 1890)
 Hyalyris leptalina (C. & R. Felder, 1865)
 Hyalyris mestra (Hopffer, 1874)
 Hyalyris ocna Herrich-Schäffer, 1865
 Hyalyris oulita (Hewitson, 1859)
 Hyalyris praxilla (Hewitson, 1870)
 Hyalyris schlingeri Real, 1971

References

Ithomiini
Nymphalidae of South America
Taxa named by Jean Baptiste Boisduval
Nymphalidae genera